Sharolta Louisa Nonen (born December 30, 1977) is a Canadian former soccer defender and current women's soccer coach of the Florida International University Panthers. She played for the Nebraska Cornhuskers in college, where she was the first three-time All-American and the first Big 12 Player of the Year in program history. With the Atlanta Beat in the Women's United Soccer Association, Nonen was an All-Star with and named Top 3 defenders in the WUSA, All Star Player for Fortuna Hjørring (Danish League) and led the team to its first First place finish in over 10 years, Atlanta Silverbacks she was the First Player coach in Silverbacks semi-professional history and she led the team to one of its highest finishes ever, she was an All Star at FC Indiana (W-League) and with Los Angeles Sol (WPS) was a part of the National Championship team in 2009.

She was a member of the Canadian National Team, taking part in the 1999 and 2003 World Cups where she was named to the All-Tournament team in both appearances (Top 11 Players in Women's World Cup). She was also named twice as a starter to lead the back line in the All-World Team games 2001 & 2003.

Since retiring, Nonen has coached in the Youth, Olympic, Regional, National, Semi-Professional and Collegiate ranks.

International career
In August 2006 Charmaine Hooper and Christine Latham refused to attend two exhibition games against China and fell into dispute with team coach Even Pellerud. Nonen joined Hooper and Latham in publicly calling for Pellerud's removal. Pellerud had pressured them to break their club contracts in order to join Vancouver Whitecaps and had tried to fix the outcome of a USL W-League play-off by releasing certain national team players but not others. Pellerud was abusive towards players and forced players to play through significant injuries or risk losing their funding. The players boycotted the 2007 World Cup and demanded fair and safe conditions for themselves and their teammates."

References

External links
 
 Canada Soccer player profile
 WPS Atlanta Beat player profile
 WUSA Atlanta Beat player profile
 Nebraska player profile

Los Angeles Sol players
1977 births
Living people
Soccer players from Vancouver
Nebraska Cornhuskers women's soccer players
Atlanta Beat (WUSA) players
Atlanta Beat (WPS) players
Canada women's international soccer players
Canadian women's soccer players
1999 FIFA Women's World Cup players
2003 FIFA Women's World Cup players
Black Canadian women's soccer players
Atlanta Silverbacks Women players
Women's association football managers
Fortuna Hjørring players
Expatriate women's footballers in Denmark
Canadian expatriate women's soccer players
Canadian expatriate sportspeople in Denmark
Women's association football defenders
FIU Panthers women's soccer coaches
F.C. Indiana players
Canadian soccer coaches
East Carolina Pirates women's soccer coaches
Georgia Gwinnett Grizzlies women's soccer coaches
Canadian expatriate sportspeople in the United States
Expatriate women's soccer players in the United States
Expatriate soccer managers in the United States
Canadian expatriate soccer coaches
Women's Professional Soccer players
Women's United Soccer Association players